The Region Seefeld is a tourist region in Tyrol, Austria. It provides the entire infrastructure of a Nordic centre for  winter sport and a wide range of facilities for the summer season.

Geography 
The region is made up of the municipalities of Seefeld in Tirol, Leutasch, Reith bei Seefeld, Scharnitz and the two villages in the municipality of Telfs: Mösern and Buchen. Seefeld is the main centre of the region.

The region covers the Seefeld Plateau, Leutasch valley and Scharnitz Basin.

External links 
 Olympiaregion Seefeld

Seefeld
Seefeld
Wetterstein
Innsbruck-Land District
Sport in Tyrol (state)